Covert Operations was a game developer founded in Scotland in 2000 by Niall Fraser. The company developed titles for a range of platforms including Interactive Digital Television, mobile phones and handheld games devices. One notable title was the Game Boy Color version of Denki's award-winning game Denki Blocks!

In May 2003 Covert Operations was sold to pioneering game studio IOMO for an undisclosed sum.

Games
 Denki Blocks! (2001)
 Run Pepper Run (2003)

References

External links
 Covert Operations at Spong

Defunct video game companies of the United Kingdom
Mobile game companies
Video game development companies